Portsoken, traditionally referred to with the definite article as the Portsoken, is one of the City of London's 25 ancient wards, which are still used for local elections. Historically an extra-mural Ward, lying east of Aldgate and the City walls, the area is sometimes considered to be part of the East End of London.

The ward is about 5 hectares in area, and is mainly oriented north-south, with the central part informally known as Aldgate.

History
John Stow's Survey of London records that the "soke" – in this context the right to extract fines as a source of income – (later "liberty") was granted in the time of Saxon king Edgar the Peaceful, east of Aldgate to a guild of knights, the Cnichtengild, in exchange, essentially, for regular jousting. Norman kings confirmed these rights but later the land was voluntarily transferred to the Priory of the Holy Trinity by the descendants of the guild.

In 1120 or 1121 (the exact date is unknown), the Portsoken was granted as a liberty to the Priory of Holy Trinity, which had been founded in 1107 by Queen Matilda, the wife of King Henry I. The sitting prior of Holy Trinity became, ex officio, an alderman of the City of London Corporation representing the Portsoken ward, and remained so until the Dissolution of the Monasteries by King Henry VIII in 1531. The Ward originally extended as far south as the Thames, but the growth of the Tower of London beyond the line of the London Wall, disputes with the Tower, the creation of the Liberties of the Tower of London and other factors resulted in the southern area being lost to the ward and to the City of London as a whole, after around 1200.

In 1332, a tax assessment showed 23 taxpayers in the Portsoken. However, this figure only included freemen of the City of London who possessed moveable property worth more than 10 shillings, and so did not include the poor, non-citizens, or members of religious orders. A later subsidy roll from 1582 showed that the ward's taxpayers had been assessed to pay a total of 57 pounds, 11 shillings and 4 pence.

The Portsoken has long had a mixed population, and in 1483 is recorded as having more aliens in its population than any ward in the City Of London. Since the 1840s, nearly all of the Aldermen of the Ward have been Jewish.

Boundary changes in 1994 and 2013 made often fundamental changes to the ancient Wards. The Portsoken (in the City of London) and the neighbouring Tower Hamlets exchanged territory, with the Middlesex Street Estate being transferred to the Portsoken.

Land was also exchanged with the Aldgate Ward (Aldgate was formerly entirely within the wall, with the Portsoken entirely without), so that John Cass's Foundation Primary School (now The Aldgate School) is now part of the ward, despite lying just inside the line of the wall.

The Portsoken is now regarded as one of the City's four residential wards, with a population of 985 (2011).

Politics

Portsoken is one of 25 wards in the City of London, each electing an alderman to the Court of Aldermen, and commoners (the City equivalent of a councillor) to the Court of Common Council of the City of London Corporation. Only electors who are Freemen of the City are eligible to stand for election.

Keith Joseph, Secretary of State for Industry 1979–1981 and Secretary of State for Education and Science 1981–1986, took the area as his territorial designation on elevation to the Lords in 1987. Similarly, Peter Levene (Lord Mayor 1998–1999) in 1997. Joseph's father was Lord Mayor in 1942–1943.

In 2014 William Campbell-Taylor made history when he became the first ever party politician to win a seat on the City of London's Common Council, standing as a Labour candidate in a by-election in the ward of Portsoken. William Campbell-Taylor stood down as a Common Councilman in March 2017 at the end of his time in office.

In the 2017 City-wide Common Council elections, the Labour Party won two seats in Portsoken ward with local residents Jason Pritchard and Munsur Ali topping the polls and Independent incumbents John Fletcher and Henry Jones elected in third and fourth place respectively. The Labour Party won a record total of five seats on the Common Council in March 2017, winning two seats in Portsoken, two seats in Cripplegate ward and one seat in Aldersgate ward.

In December 2017, William Campbell-Taylor stood as the first ever party political candidate to contest a City of London Aldermanic election, standing for Labour in Portsoken ward, but was defeated by Independent candidate Prem Goyal. Prem Goyal is the founder of the UK political party, All People's Party, although to date Goyal has chosen to stand as an Independent in elections in the City of London.

City of London Corporation election, 2022

On 23 March 2022, the quadrennial Citywide Common Council Elections were held across the City of London. The election that took place in Portsoken Ward recorded the highest turnout in the entire 2022 Common Council Elections with 57.6% of the electorate casting their vote. The average turnout across the rest of the City of London was much lower at 36.5%. Two incumbent councillors, Munsur Ali and Jason Paul Pritchard, who were elected as Labour candidates in 2017, stood jointly and were both re-elected. John Fletcher and Henry Jones stood jointly and were both re-elected. Changes in voteshare are by party for the Labour candidates and by candidate for independent candidates who previously stood as independents.

See also
East End of London

References

External links
 Map of Portsoken ward City of London Corporation (2003–)
 Map of Early Modern London: Portsoken Ward - Historical Map and Encyclopedia of Shakespeare's London

Wards of the City of London